Catrin Rhodes (born May 17, 1981), known professionally as Evil Pimp (alternatively by his alter-ego name of Stan Man), is an American rapper, songwriter, record producer, and recording engineer.  He is the founder of the Krucifix Klan and has produced for and overseen the careers of many rappers, including Playa Rob, Ms. Insain, Suave C, Creep Lo, Lady Dead, Chuck G, Sir Lance, DJ Slikk, Killa Queen, Drama Queen, Crazy Mane, Lil Bone, Gangsta Rip, DJ Massacre, Reese G, Lil Jerk, Lil Boosie, HR2, Ms Loko, Polo Fresh, Ill B, Killa Elite, Evil Prince, and many more. He is credited as a key figure in the crafting and popularization of "horrorcore", a rap style characterized as hypnotic beats and dark themes—especially drugs, sex, and violence.

Music career

Beginnings 
Evil Pimp began his career in the 1990s, when at the time he lived in Cedar Rapids.  Although he began recording in 1996, his professional entertainment career did not take off until January 2005 when his previous year's solo album Da Exorcist Returns  reached #5 on the Billboard top internet album sales chart.  The talent and production showcased on the album has been admired by a large part of the underground hip hop community .The album is frequently recognized as one of the crowning achievements of "horrorcore" rap music.  He was also featured in various magazines, most significantly appearing in The Source Magazine.

In 2003, Rhodes formed the group Krucifix Klan with a number of his friends from Iowa, including Playa Rob, Crazy Mane, Creep Lo, Stan Man and Drama Queen. The group released their debut album Da Krucifixin on June 15, 2004.  Later in the year, Evil Pimp released The Exorcist Greatest Hits Volume 1, which was a compilation of tracks from some of his initial underground cassettes.

Production work 
Rhodes has worked with an array of acts that span within the underground rap scene and has helped produce many albums for various artists.  He uses a variety of production equipment to compose hip hop beats. He primarily uses an Akai MPC 4000, Pro Tools, Logic Pro, Roland TR-808 and electronic keyboards manufactured by Korg, Roland and Yamaha.

Evil Pimp cites Academy Award-winning hip hop group Three 6 Mafia as his signature music production inspirations with other musical influences ranging from DJ Zirk to DJ Squeeky.  He is also known for his mastery of the "Memphis" style beats, his production techniques bring together a diverse array of genres that evolve into a very distinct and unique sound.

Discography

Solo projects

Group projects

Associate projects

Underground projects

References 

Underground rappers
Horrorcore artists
Gangsta rappers
African-American male rappers
Southern hip hop musicians
1981 births
Living people
21st-century American rappers
21st-century American male musicians
21st-century African-American musicians
20th-century African-American people